The 14th Annual Nickelodeon Kids' Choice Awards was held on April 21, 2001, at Santa Monica Airport's Barker Hangar in Santa Monica, California. It aired live on Nickelodeon and was hosted by Rosie O'Donnell for the sixth consecutive year.

Nominees

Movies

Television

Music

Sports

Miscellaneous

Wannabe Award
Tom Cruise

Musical performers
 Backstreet Boys - "More than That"
 Aaron Carter - "That's How I Beat Shaq"
 Destiny's Child - "Survivor"
 Lil' Bow Wow - "Bounce With Me"

Slimed celebrities
 *NSYNC: Slimed by O'Donnell from a different location.
 Melissa Joan Hart: Also slimed from a different location.
 Tom Cruise: After accepting the Wannabe Award, O'Donnell asked him to slime the mystery celebrity at the end of the show, and had him press a button to do so; he ended up sliming himself as the 'mystery celebrity', much to his surprise and enjoyment.
 Rosie O'Donnell: O'Donnell joined Cruise in the slime at the end of the show.

References

External links
 

Nickelodeon Kids' Choice Awards
Kids' Choice Awards
Kids' Choice Awards
Kids' Choice Awards
April 2001 events in the United States